Tadeusz Radwan (June 27, 1945 – October 25, 2003) was a Polish luger who competed in the late 1960s and early 1970s. He was born in Koziniec. He won the bronze medal in the men's doubles event at the 1971 FIL European Luge Championships in Imst, Austria.

Radwan also finished 22nd in the men's singles event at the 1968 Winter Olympics in Grenoble. He died in Bielsko-Biała in October 2003.

References
 1968 Winter Olympics men's singles results
 List of European luge champions 
 Tadeusz Radwan's profile at Sports Reference.com

Lugers at the 1968 Winter Olympics
Polish male lugers
1945 births
2003 deaths
Olympic lugers of Poland
People from Wadowice County
Sportspeople from Lesser Poland Voivodeship